Elk Point is a town located in east-central Alberta, Canada. It is located on Highway 41.

A number of oil related businesses have located in Elk Point.  Agriculture is also important in the Elk Point area.

Elk Point is located on the North Saskatchewan River which was a fur trade route.  Both the Hudson's Bay Company and the North West Company had posts on the river near Elk Point.  Alberta Culture has built an interpretive centre near the remains of Fort George and Buckingham House.

There is a large carved statue of Peter Fidler (a figure from fur trade days) near Elk Point and a mural of Elk Point history near the town centre.  The Iron Horse Trail, a rail trail, is nearby. Elk Point was a fur trading post in the fur trade days.

Elk Point celebrated its centennial on June 30 and July 1, 2007.

Geography

Climate 
Elk Point has a dry continental climate (Köppen climate classification Dfb).

Demographics 

In the 2016 Census of Population conducted by Statistics Canada, the Town of Elk Point recorded a population of 1,452 living in 534 of its 642 total private dwellings, a  change from its 2011 population of 1,412.

The Town of Elk Point's 2012 municipal census counted a population of 1,571, a 3.9% increase over its 2007 municipal census population of 1,512.

Notable people 
Adam Kleeberger - Team Canada rugby player
Mark Letestu - professional ice hockey player
Audrey Poitras - president of the Metis Nation of Alberta since 1996
Sheldon Souray - professional ice hockey player

See also 
List of communities in Alberta
List of towns in Alberta

References

External links 

1938 establishments in Alberta
Populated places on the North Saskatchewan River
Towns in Alberta
Populated places established in 1938